Johnny Kemper (July 31, 1944 – June 13, 2012) was an American bodybuilder and actor. He was the owner of the Diamond Gym, which he sold in 2007.

Selected filmography
 Surfari (1967)
 Women in Revolt (1971)

References

External links
 

1944 births
2012 deaths
20th-century American male actors
American male film actors
American bodybuilders
Professional bodybuilders
World Games gold medalists
Competitors at the 1981 World Games